Hozo is a graphical ontology editor especially created to produce heavy-weight ontologies. It was developed in Japan through a partnership between the Department of Knowledge Systems (Mizoguchi Laboratory), ISIR-Osaka University, and Enegate Co, Ltd.

References

External links
 Official website 
 Mizoguchi Laboratory
 Enegate

Ontology editors
Osaka University research